You Can't Fight What You Can't See is the sixth studio album by American post-hardcore/indie rock band Girls Against Boys, released in 2002 by record label Jade Tree. It was their first album released on the label, and also their last release before the band went on hiatus.

It received generally favorable reviews from critics.

Reception 

You Can't Fight What You Can't See has received a generally favorable reception from critics. A less favorable review, however, came from Kevin Adickes of Pitchfork, who wrote, "there's not much here to love, which just leaves one to wonder if history will remember any of Girls Against Boys' records beyond 1994's Venus Luxure No. 1 Baby. God knows I won't."

Track listing 

 "Basstation" – 3:44
 "All the Rage" – 4:02
 "300 Looks for the Summer" – 3:01
 "Tweaker" – 3:46
 "Miami Skyline" - 3:30
 "Resonance" – 4:24
 "BFF" – 3:46
 "Kicking the Lights" – 3:39
 "One Perfect Thing" – 2:55
 "The Come Down" – 4:02
 "Let it Breathe" – 3:48

References 

2002 albums
Girls Against Boys albums
Jade Tree (record label) albums
Albums produced by Ted Niceley